This is a list of the largest video-capable screens in the world.

See also
Jumbotron

References

External links
 Los Angeles Coliseum Astrovision Website
 Live Aid Concert Unofficial Behind-the-Scenes (Production) Website

Display technology
Technology-related lists
Videoscreens